"Like a little Love" is the eighth single by Shiori Takei and released November 8, 2006 under Giza Studio label. The single reached #59 rank first week. It charted for 1 weeks and sold over 1,605  copies.

Track list
Like a little Love
lyricist: Nana Azuki (Garnet Crow)/composer: Akihito Tokunaga (Doa)/arranger: Satoru Kobayashi

lyricist: Shiori Takei/composer: Mai Imai/arranger: Satoru Kobayashi

lyricist and composer: Shiori Takei/arranger: Hiroshi Asai (The Tambourines)
Like a little Love (less vocal)

References

2006 singles
2006 songs
Being Inc. singles
Giza Studio singles
Songs with music by Akihito Tokunaga
Songs with lyrics by Nana Azuki